The 1904 Maine gubernatorial election took place on September 12, 1904.

Incumbent Governor John Fremont Hill did not seek re-election. Republican candidate William T. Cobb defeated Democratic candidate Cyrus W. Davis.

Results

Notes

References

Gubernatorial
1904
Maine
September 1904 events